Associação Atlética Internacional, commonly referred to as simply Inter de Limeira, is a Brazilian association football club in Limeira, São Paulo.  They currently play in the Série D, the fourth tier of Brazilian football, as well as in the Campeonato Paulista, São Paulo's premier state league.

The club's home colours are black and white and the team mascot is a lion.

History
On October 2, 1913, at Teatro da Paz (meaning Peace Theater) members of an amateur football club called Barroquinha decided to professionalise their club, and established a monthly fee to be paid by its members and associates. On October 5, 1913, Associação Atlética Internacional was officially founded. The club was named after a São Paulo city club named Internacional (not to be confused with the still active Internacional of Porto Alegre). According to some fans, the club is named to honor the several immigrant communities in Limeira, like the German, Italian, Japanese, and Portuguese communities.

In 1926, Internacional won its first title, the São Paulo Countryside Cup.

In 1982, the club contested the Campeonato Brasileiro Série A for the first time. Inter de Limeira finished in the 23rd position, ahead of big clubs like Cruzeiro and Atlético Paranaense.

In 1986, Internacional, managed by Pepe, won the Campeonato Paulista. It was the first time that a countryside club won the competition. In the semifinals, Inter de Limeira beat Santos, and in the final, the club defeated Palmeiras.

In 1988, Inter de Limeira won its first national title, the Campeonato Brasileiro Série B. In the final four, the club finished ahead of Náutico of Pernambuco state, Ponte Preta of São Paulo state and Americano of Rio de Janeiro state. The club was promoted to the following year's Campeonato Brasileiro Série A.

Achievements
Campeonato Brasileiro Série B: 1
 1988
Campeonato Paulista: 1
1986
Taça dos Campeões Estaduais Rio-São Paulo: 1
1986
Campeonato Paulista Série A2: 3
1978, 1996, 2004
Campeonato Paulista Série A3: 1
1966
Campeonato Paulista Sub-20: 1
2003
Taça Belo Horizonte de Juniores: 1
1990

Stadium

Inter de Limeira's home stadium is Estádio Major José Levy Sobrinho, also known as Limeirão, inaugurated in 1977, with a maximum capacity of 23,475 people.

Notable managers
 Nelsinho Baptista
 Pepe
 Valdir Peres
 Elano

Club colors
Internacional's colors are black and white.

Anthem
The club's anthem was composed by Joel Navarini, and it is called "Avante Leão!" (meaning "Go ahead Lion!").

Nickname
The club is nicknamed Leão da Paulista (meaning "Lion of Paulista"). The nickname appeared after a match between Internacional and Comercial-Ribeirão Preto of Ribeirão Preto. Comercial is nicknamed Leão, and after a successful trip when the club remained undefeated, the club was beaten by Inter de Limeira, which then adopted the nickname.

Mascot
Inter de Limeira's mascot is called Leão, meaning lion. He is usually depicted wearing the club's home or away kit.

References

External links
Official Site
Internacional at Arquivo de Clubes
Internacional at Futebol Interior

 
Internacional de Limeira
Association football clubs established in 1913
1913 establishments in Brazil
Limeira